Adam Powell may refer to:

Adam Powell (rugby union) (born 1987), English rugby player
Adam Powell (game designer) (born 1976), one of the founders of Neopets
Adam Powell (cricketer) (1912–1982), English cricketer
Adam Powell (English politician) (died 1546), MP for Gloucester
Adam Powell (director) (born 1981)

Adam Clayton Powell
Adam Clayton Powell may refer to:

People 
Adam Clayton Powell Sr. (1865–1953), pastor
Adam Clayton Powell Jr. (1908–1972), politician and civil rights leader
Adam Clayton Powell III (born 1946), son of Adam Clayton Powell, Jr. and Hazel Scott
Adam Clayton Powell IV (born 1962), son of Adam Clayton Powell, Jr., member of the New York State Assembly

Other 
Adam Clayton Powell Jr. Boulevard, the name for Manhattan's Seventh Avenue, north of Central Park, in Harlem
Adam Clayton Powell (film), a 1989 documentary about the civil rights leader